the 2023 CAFA U-17 Women's Championship  is the upcoming 2nd edition of the CAFA U-17 Women's Championship, the international women's youth football championship organised by Central Asian Football Association (CAFA) for the women's under-17 national teams of Central Asia. It is set to take place in Hisor, Tajikistan. A total of four teams including host Tajikistan will participate in the tournament, with Kyrgyz Republic debuting in the tournament.

Uzbekistan are the defending champions having won the inaugural tournament in 2021.

Participating nations
On 6 March 2023, CAFA confirmed the participation of four member associations in the tournament. Kyrgyz Republic are scheduled to debut in the tournament after withdrawing from the first edition before the start of the tournament. despite participating in the first edition Afghanistan missed out on this edition.

Match officials
the CAFA's selected referees and assistant referees appointed for the tournament, are yet to be announced.

Squads

Players born on or after 1 January 2006 are eligible to compete in the tournament. Each team must register a squad of a minimum of 18 players and a maximum of 23 players.

Main tournament
The main tournament schedule was announced on 5 March 2023.

Goalscorers

References

External links

2023 CAFA U-17 Women's Championship
2023 in Tajikistani football
2023 in women's association football
2023 in youth association football
Women's football in Tajikistan
CAFA